The Invitation is a 2022 American horror thriller film directed by Jessica M. Thompson and written by Blair Butler. The film stars Nathalie Emmanuel and Thomas Doherty. Inspired by the novel Dracula by Bram Stoker, the film follows a young woman who, following her mother's death, meets long-lost family members for the first time, only to discover the dark secrets they carry with them.

Originally titled The Bride, the film was produced by Sam Raimi and Robert Tapert's Ghost House Pictures, with Butler writing the script. However, Raimi and Tapert exited due to scheduling conflicts. By 2020, the film's director, producer and new title were announced. Casting occurred from May to October 2021, with filming beginning that September in Budapest.

The Invitation was released theatrically in the United States on August 26, 2022, by Sony Pictures Releasing. It received generally negative reviews from critics, praising Emmanuel's acting but criticizing the story, screenplay, and horror elements. The film was a box office success grossing $33 million worldwide on a $10 million budget.

Plot 

In New York City, struggling artist Evelyn "Evie" Jackson makes a living freelancing for a catering business with her best friend Grace. Evie takes a DNA test, discovering she has a distant cousin in England named Oliver Alexander. She meets Oliver, who tells her the scandal of her great-grandmother, Emmaline, who had a secret child with a black footman. He invites her to an upcoming family wedding in England. Evie arrives in Whitby at the New Carfax Abbey, where she meets the lord of the manor, Walter De Ville, and Mrs. Swift, a longtime maid of the estate. She also meets the rest of the Alexander family and the maids of honor, friendly Lucy and condescending Viktoria.

Evie gradually begins to notice unsettling occurrences during her stay. She sees an apparition of Emmaline, who was shown in a flashback, hanging herself from the staircase. Maids start disappearing as they are attacked by a shadowy figure. Evie finds herself romanced by De Ville before discovering he had been researching her before her arrival. She confronts him and threatens to leave, but the two reconcile and have sex.

The family hosts a rehearsal dinner, where Evie expects to finally meet the bride and groom. Instead, De Ville announces that he and Evie are to be wed. The butler, Mr. Field, slits a maid's throat and pours her blood into a bowl. De Ville, Lucy, and Viktoria are all revealed to be vampires who then drink the maid's blood. Evie's ancestors, the Alexanders, are one of the three families who, for centuries, have each offered one of their women to become De Ville's wife in exchange for protection and wealth. Emmaline was originally intended to be De Ville's third bride, but she killed herself due to her guilt of killing humans, and due to the loss of her love, Evie's great-grandfather, and infant son. The Alexander family had trouble finding a female member until they found Evie. Viktoria locks a frantic Evie inside a coffin, but she is freed by Mrs. Swift, who is killed by Mr. Field. Evie makes it into town and asks an elderly couple, who reveal themselves to be Jonathan and Mina Harker, for help but is knocked unconscious, as they work for De Ville.

Evie wakes up to find herself with one of the maids, Imogen, and De Ville. De Ville reveals himself to be Dracula as he mentions he was once known as the "Son of the Dragon". Evie then watches De Ville bite into Imogen's leg and falls unconscious. Upon waking up, Evie is now in a wedding dress, walking down the aisle to wed De Ville. As they finish exchanging vows, she bites De Ville's arm, consuming his blood, and instantly transforms into a vampire. She sets the wedding chapel on fire, stabs De Ville in the heart, which rapidly ages him, and flees with Diya, another maid. An enraged Viktoria ambushes Evie, who is helped by Diya. After Diya flees, Viktoria attacks Evie again before Lucy intervenes. The two vampires fight before Lucy impales both Viktoria and herself on a spear, turning them both into ashes.

Shortly thereafter, Evie is attacked by Field wielding a spear, who states that he wished he had killed her great-grandfather and grandfather, before she kills him by breaking off the spearhead and stabbing him in the chest. She is then chased by a wall-crawling De Ville, who grabs her by the throat. She breaks free by severing his wrist with a cutting wire and kicks him into the flames. As he burns alive, she loses her powers due to his death and reverts into the human form. Evie escapes as the manor is engulfed in flames.

Two weeks later, in London, Evie and Grace have tracked down Oliver, who prepares to flee after having paid off the police. The two women intend to kill him for tricking Evie and being complicit in the murders committed by the vampires.

Cast 

In addition, Carol Ann Crawford portrays Mrs. Swift, Evie's maid.

Production 
In April 2019, Screen Gems acquired an untitled pitch from Blair Butler, who was also attached to write the screenplay. Sam Raimi and Robert Tapert were on board to produce the film for their production company Ghost House Pictures; however, they eventually exited the project. In June 2020, it was revealed that the film would be titled The Bride and that Jessica M. Thompson was set to direct, with Emile Gladstone producing without Raimi and Tapert. The original script was written by Butler, who drew inspiration from Bram Stoker's 1897 novel Dracula, with revisions by Thompson. In June 2022, the film's new title was announced as The Invitation.

Nathalie Emmanuel and Garrett Hedlund were cast in lead roles in May 2021. That August, Alana Boden and Stephanie Corneliussen were added to the main cast. In October, Thomas Doherty, Hugh Skinner, Sean Pertwee, and Courtney Taylor joined the cast, with Doherty replacing Hedlund.

Principal photography began in September 2021 in Budapest, Hungary.

Release 
The Invitation was released theatrically in the United States on August 26, 2022, by Sony Pictures Releasing. The film was released digitally on September 16, 2022, and on Blu-ray and DVD on October 25, 2022. As part of Netflix's first window deal with Sony, the film was released in the United States on December 24, 2022. For the week ending January 1, 2023, the film was number 5 on the global chart of Netflix views, with 12.2 million hours viewed on the service.

Box office 
The Invitation grossed $25.1 million in the United States and Canada, and $8.6 million in other territories, for a worldwide total of $33.7 million, against a budget of $10 million.

In the United States and Canada, The Invitation was released alongside Three Thousand Years of Longing and Breaking. The film made $2.6 million on its first day (including $775,000 from Thursday night previews) and grossed $6.8 million from 3,114 theaters during its opening weekend. It was the lowest-grossing film to top the box office since Spiral ($4.5 million) in May 2021. In its sophomore weekend the film made $4.7 million (and a total of $5.7 million over the four-day Labor Day frame), dropping 30.7% and finishing fifth.

Critical response 
 

Natalia Winkelman of The New York Times wrote: "For a fright-fest as broad as this one, there's an awful lot of banal dialogue, and the scare patterns are repetitive enough that even the easiest startlers (I count myself among them) grow immune early on." Joe Leydon of Variety wrote in his review: "Despite some ambitious efforts to revitalize hoary horror movie tropes with allegorical commentary on race, class and male privilege, [the film] is too wearyingly hackneyed for too much of its running time."

Notes

References

External links 
 
 
 

2022 films
2022 horror thriller films
2020s American films
2020s English-language films
American horror thriller films
American vampire films
Dracula films
Films about the upper class
Films about weddings in the United Kingdom
Films set in country houses
Films set in London
Films set in New York City
Films set in Whitby
Films shot in Budapest
Gothic horror films
Screen Gems films
TSG Entertainment films